Airton Moisés Santos Sousa (born 2 February 1999), known as Airton, is a Brazilian footballer who plays as a forward for Cruzeiro.

Club career
Born in Belém, Pará, Airton joined Palmeiras' youth setup in 2016, after a trial period. On 16 August 2019, after finishing his formation, he was loaned to Série B side Oeste until the end of the season.

Airton made his professional debut on 19 August 2019, coming on as a second-half substitute for Betinho in a 0–2 home loss against Coritiba. On 12 December, after just one further appearance, he rescinded with Verdão and signed for Inter de Limeira.

On 20 August 2020, Airton signed a three-and-a-half-year contract with Cruzeiro in the second division. He scored his first professional goal on 25 October, netting the equalizer in a 1–1 draw at Náutico.

On 23 July 2021, Airton agreed to a loan deal with Série A side Ceará until December. He made his top tier debut two days later, replacing Rick in a 0–0 away draw against Sport Recife.

Career statistics

Honours
 Atlético Goianiense
Campeonato Goiano: 2022

References

External links
Ceará profile 

1999 births
Living people
Sportspeople from Belém
Brazilian footballers
Association football forwards
Campeonato Brasileiro Série A players
Campeonato Brasileiro Série B players
Sociedade Esportiva Palmeiras players
Oeste Futebol Clube players
Associação Atlética Internacional (Limeira) players
Cruzeiro Esporte Clube players
Ceará Sporting Club players
Atlético Clube Goianiense players